The Dzongkha keyboard layout scheme is designed as a simple means for inputting Dzongkha (རྫོང་ཁ) and classical Tibetan (ཆོས་སྐད) text on computers. This keyboard layout was standardized by the Dzongkha Development Commission (DDC) and the  Department of Information Technology and Telecom (DITT) of the Royal Government of Bhutan in 2000. It was updated in 2009 to accommodate additional characters added to the Unicode & ISO 10646 standards since the initial version.

Since the arrangement of keys essentially follows the usual order of the Dzongkha and Tibetan alphabet, the layout can be quickly learned by anyone familiar with this alphabet. Subjoined (combining) consonants are entered using the Shift key. 

The Dzongkha (dz) keyboard layout is included in the XFree86 distribution.

Keyboard layout
Dzongkha (Bhutan) - dz-BT

Alternative Dzongkha input
Dzongkha Keyboard & Input Methods - National Library of Bhutan
Dzongkha Typing Tutor
Dzongkha Keyboard map -THDL
Dzongkha Unicode Keyboard for Windows - THDL
Dzongkha Keyboard for Mac OS X
Dzongkha Computing Instructions - Dzongkha Development Commission, Bhutan

Keyboard layouts
Dzongkha language
Tibetan character input